Utichy Island (Russian: Утичий остров, Ostrov Utichy) is a small island in the western Sea of Okhotsk. It is one of the Shantar Islands. It lies southwest of the southwest point of Bolshoy Shantar Island and northeast of Ptichy Island.

Fauna

In the summer, a large colony of spectacled guillemot and a small nesting colony of thick-billed murre reside on the island.

History

American whaleships targeting bowhead whales cruised off Utichy from the 1850s to the 1880s. They called it Little Stinker Island. Along with Ptichy, it was considered one of the Stinker Islands.

On August 1, 1981, an Aeroflot Ilyushin Il-14M, flying in poor visibility, crashed into the southwest side of Utichy, killing all 11 people on board.

References

Shantar Islands
Islands of the Sea of Okhotsk
Islands of the Russian Far East
Islands of Khabarovsk Krai